Sorel-Moussel is a commune in the Eure-et-Loir department in northern France.

It holds an important archaeological site known as Fort-Harrouard (fr), a Neolithic village first studied at the turn of the 20th century by abbé Philippe.

The medieval remains of Château de Sorel, are located nearby.

Population

See also 

Communes of the Eure-et-Loir department

References 

Communes of Eure-et-Loir